The Interstate Civil Defense and Disaster Compact is an interstate compact that originally included 22 states and the District of Columbia. The compact was made as a state response to the Federal Civil Defense Act of 1950. It established a system for administering disaster response and defense aid. It is unclear how many states are a part of the contract due to some states replacing it with the Emergency Management Assistance Compact.

References

United States interstate compacts